Sound Riot Records is an independent record label founded in March 1994 in Brazil. The company started as a small mailorder service for demo-tapes and 7"EPs. In the same year, the CD distribution started and Sound Riot Records became the official distributor for European record labels such as Displeased, Misanthropy, Holy, No Fashion, Cold Meat Industry, Avantgarde Music, and among others.
 
The idea to running an own record label came during 1995 and the debut release came out in March 1996. In March 1999, they decided to move to Europe. Since then, the company is based in Portugal and they have signed various European black, doom, death and power metal bands such as Tristwood, Requiem, Chain Collector, Excalion, Infernum, Frostmoon and Svartsyn.

Artists
Burialmound
Chain Collector
Demon Child
Excalion
Frostmoon
Ghost Machinery
Grand Alchemist
Grayscale
Holocaust
Inborn Suffering
Incinerator
Infernum
Madog
Nightside
Requiem
Rupture Christ
Satans Blood
Shadow Season
Svartsyn
Tristwood
Unchained
Vicious
VII Gates
Wish

External links
Official website
Sound Riot Records at Myspace.com
Sound Riot Records at Discogs
Sound Riot Records at Rate Your Music

Brazilian independent record labels
Portuguese record labels
Black metal record labels
Death metal record labels
Doom metal record labels
Thrash metal record labels
Heavy metal record labels
Record labels established in 1994